Footprints in the Desert is the fifth studio album by Hugh Cornwell, released in April 2002 by Track Record. This album, Cornwell's second "lost album", compiles rare and unreleased tracks from the mid-1990s that were not part of a record deal. It was recorded in Bath with James Cadsky, who engineered the Wired album.

The same year, Track Records also reissued Cornwell's 1999 album, Mayday, on CD.

In 2006, Cornwell told online music magazine Penny Black Music that the album "was a set of songs that I had recorded in the mid 90's which had never got released because I was out of a publishing deal and out of a record contract. On demand from the fan base we decided to put that out."

Track listing

Personnel
Credits adapted from AllMusic.

Musicians
Hugh Cornwell – vocals, instrumentation
Phil Andrews – keyboards 
Chris Goulstone – guitar 
Ted Mason – guitar
Steve Lawrence – bass
Chris Bell – drums
Spencer May – percussion programming

Technical
Hugh Cornwell – engineer, mixing, liner notes
Phil Andrews – engineer, mixing
Spencer May – engineer
Robin Barclay – mixing
Trevor Curwen – mixing
Shaun Kirkpatrick – mixing
Chris Goulstone – mixing, mastering
Ra – graphic design
Eric Fagence – cover painting
Bob Whitfield – cover photo

References

2002 albums
Hugh Cornwell albums